Calixto Malcom (15 February 1947 – February 2021) was a Panamanian basketball player. He competed in the men's tournament at the 1968 Summer Olympics.

References

External links
 

1947 births
2021 deaths
Panamanian men's basketball players
Olympic basketball players of Panama
Basketball players at the 1968 Summer Olympics
Sportspeople from Panama City